Yuri Nikolaevich Stoyanov (born July 10, 1957 in Odessa) is a  Soviet and Russian theater and film actor, musician. People's Artist of the Russian Federation (2001). Most famous comedian duo with Ilya Oleynikov.

Biography
Was born July 10, 1957 in Odessa, as a child he moved under Odessa to the village of Borodino. Mother is Russian, Yevgenia Leonidovna Stoyanova (born June 21, 1935), worked as deputy director for educational work, director of a pedagogical college and taught Ukrainian language and literature, honored worker of education of Ukraine. He lives in Odessa. Father — Bulgarian, Nikolai Georgievich Stoyanov worked as a gynecologist, died in 1993.

In 1974 he entered the GITIS. After graduation in 1978, he played at the Tovstonogov Bolshoi Drama Theater, where he worked as an actor until 1995.

Received nationwide fame after the release of the sketch show Gorodok, which he created and led together with Ilya Oleynikov from 1993 to 2012.

October 30, 2018  joined the Council on Public Television by decree of the President of the Russian Federation.

Personal life
Stoyanov married thrice. Stoyanov has three daughters and two stepdaughters. Stoyanov has two sons from his first marriage.

Partial filmography

 Girl and Grand (1982) as Journalist (uncredited)
 Aleko/Kashchey the Immortal (1987) as The Storm Knight
 Anekdoty (1990) as Imperator
 Silver Lily of the Valley (1990) as Pridorozhny
 Alkhimiki (2000)
 Rabbit Over the Void (2006) as Semion Grossu
 12 (2007) as 6th Juror
  (2007) as Ignat Savich
 Kingdom of Crooked Mirrors (2007, TV Movie) as Most Important Master of Ceremonies
 Yeralash (2007, TV Series) as robber (voice)
 Hitler Goes Kaput! (2008) as Martin Bormann
  (2008) as Johnny
  (2010) as Daniil Sorin
  (2010)
  (2011)
  (2011) (voice)
  (2012)
 Cinderella (2012) as Viktor Pavlovich Chugainov, oil magnate
 The White Guard (2012, TV Series) as General-mayor Blokhin
 The Snow Queen (2012) as King (voice)
  (2014) as Gena
  (2014) as Dyadya Pasha
 Barmen (2015) as Papa Yulii
  (2016) as Boruh (voice)
 Kavkazskoe trio (2016) as Timur's Father
 Moscow Never Sleeps (2017) as Valeriy
 Ten (2017) as Panov
  (2017) as Generalnyy
 The Crimean Bridge. Made with Love! (2018) as boss
  (2018) as Bogeslav Viktorovich
  (2019) as Arkadiy Zertsalov (segment The Poet)
 Mistresses (2019) as Mikhail
  (2019)
  (2019) as Gospodin Yakovlev
  (2019) as Konstantin Semenovich
 Gudbay, Amerika! (2020)
 Love (2021) as Dima
  (2022)

References

External links
 Official site
 

1957 births
Actors from Odesa
Living people
Soviet male film actors
Soviet male stage actors
Russian male film actors
Russian male stage actors
Russian male voice actors
Russian television presenters
Recipients of the Order of Honour (Russia)
Russian Academy of Theatre Arts alumni
People's Artists of Russia
Ukrainian people of Bulgarian descent
Russian people of Bulgarian descent